Alan Hurd (7 September 1937 – 11 April 2016) was an English first-class cricketer who played for Essex.

Hurd was educated at Chigwell School and Clare College, Cambridge. An off-spin bowler, he played for Cambridge University and Essex from 1958 to 1960. His best innings and match figures came in his first match for Essex, when he took 6 for 15 and 4 for 62 in a victory over Kent.

After his first-class cricket career he taught English at Sevenoaks School. He also coached the school cricket team. He retired as Head of English and Senior Master in January 1997.

References

External links

1937 births
2016 deaths
English cricketers
Essex cricketers
People from Ilford
Cambridge University cricketers
Gentlemen cricketers
Alumni of Clare College, Cambridge
People educated at Chigwell School